WEMC (91.7 FM) is a classical music formatted broadcast radio station licensed to Harrisonburg, Virginia, serving Harrisonburg and Rockingham County, Virginia.  WEMC is owned by Eastern Mennonite University.

Due to declining listenership and low student involvement, James Madison University's WMRA (90.7 FM) took over operation of WEMC on January 14, 2008. WMRA moved its morning, midday, and late-night classical music blocks to WEMC in exchange for NPR's Talk of the Nation and Fresh Air, which had been heard on WEMC as WMRA was unable to fit them into its schedule. Both stations preserved their evening schedules, as WMRA was hesitant to eliminate its evening music programming due to WEMC's inferior signal.

WEMC dropped its last remaining information programs, Democracy Now! and rebroadcasts of the BBC World Service, on August 11, 2014. The station now broadcasts classical music throughout the week. There are local hosts only on Monday and Tuesday evening ("Bob's Record Shelf" and "Air Play", the latter featuring regional orchestras), with the rest of the music largely coming from the syndicated Classical 24. The only exceptions to the format are the local Mennonite music show "Mostly Mennonite, Mostly Acapella", and the service from Park View Mennonite Church in Harrisonburg live on Sunday morning.

References

External links
WEMC 91.7 Online

1955 establishments in Virginia
Classical music radio stations in the United States
Public radio stations in the United States
NPR member stations
Radio stations established in 1955
EMC
EMC
Eastern Mennonite University